Spider orchid typically refers to the orchid genus Caladenia as a whole. 

It may also mean one of the following:
 Several Corybas species, including
 Corybas macranthus
 Corybas trilobus
 Dendrobium tetragonum (Common spider orchid, Tree spider orchid)
 Bartholina burmanniana
 Several Ophrys species, including 
 Ophrys fuciflora (Late spider orchid)
 Ophrys sphegodes (Early spider orchid)
Members of the genus Brassia